The .500 S&W Special or 12.7x32mmSR is a .50 caliber revolver cartridge developed by Cor-Bon/Glaser (at Smith & Wesson's request) in 2004.

Description
It is a shorter version of the .500 S&W Magnum, with a drastically reduced load; much as the .38 Special is to the .357 Magnum. However, unlike the .357 Magnum being developed from the less powerful .38 Special, the .500 Special was designed after the more powerful .500 Magnum.

The purpose of the .500 Special is to be able to shoot less punishing loads, with a muzzle energy closer to that of the .44 Magnum cartridge, in firearms chambered for the .500 S&W Magnum. It is possible that firearms chambered for only the .500 S&W Special will be developed. Smith & Wesson has been urged by author and gun rights activist John Ross to produce their largest "X-Frame" in a shorter version to handle this cartridge. Ballistics are slightly superior to the .480 Ruger.

See also
List of handgun cartridges
12 mm caliber

References

Pistol and rifle cartridges 
Cor-Bon cartridges
Smith & Wesson cartridges